= Tsubasa-kun wa Akanuketai no ni =

Japanese manga series

- First tankōbon volume cover

翼くんはあかぬけたいのに
- Genre: Comedy; Slice of life
- Manga
- Written by: Oto Obana
- Published by: Shogakukan
- Imprint: Ura Sunday Comics
- Magazine: Hibana; (October 7, 2015 – August 7, 2017); MangaONE; (September 9, 2017 – January 6, 2024)
- Original run: October 7, 2015 – January 6, 2024
- Volumes: 14

Tsubasa-kun wa Akanuketai no ni (翼くんはあかぬけたいのに) is a Japanese manga series written and illustrated by Oto Obana. It was initially serialized in Shogakukan's seinen manga magazine Hibana between October 2015 and August 2017. After the magazine's disbandment, the series continued serialization on the MangaONE app from September 2017 up until January 2024.

== Synopsis ==
Tsubasa Hayami has moved to Tokyo from Nagano Prefecture in order to attend high school. He moves into a shared house accommodation in Omotesando, and tries to adjust to living in the city while also interacting with his stylish, but eccentric housemates.

== Publication ==
Written and illustrated by Oto Obana, Tsubasa-kun wa Akanuketai no ni was initially serialized in Shogakukan's seinen manga magazine Hibana from October 7, 2015 to August 7, 2017. After the magazine's disbandment, the series resumed serialization on the MangaONE app on September 9, 2017 up until January 6, 2024. Its chapters were compiled into fourteen tankōbon volumes released from September 12, 2017, to April 18, 2024.

No.	Release date	ISBN
1	September 12, 2017	978-4-09-127813-5
2	December 12, 2017	978-4-09-128044-2
3	June 12, 2018	978-4-09-128315-3
4	November 12, 2018	978-4-09-128646-8
5	April 12, 2019	978-4-09-129100-4
6	November 12, 2019	978-4-09-129477-7
7	June 12, 2020	978-4-09-850121-2
8	December 18, 2020	978-4-09-850362-9
9	June 17, 2021	978-4-09-850602-6
10	January 19, 2022	978-4-09-850858-7
11	July 12, 2022	978-4-09-851193-8
12	February 17, 2023	978-4-09-851635-3
13	September 19, 2023	978-4-09-852834-9
14	April 18, 2024	978-4-09-853212-4

== Reception ==
The series and was ranked 8th in the web category at the 4th Next Manga Awards in 2018.
